Deep & Meaningless is the second album by English folk singer-songwriter duo John Otway and Wild Willy Barrett. It was released in 1978. The album included the song "Beware Of The Flowers ('Cos I'm Sure They're Going To Get You Yeah)", which was voted Britain's seventh most popular song lyric in a 1999 BBC online poll. The song's strong showing—ahead of The Moody Blues' "Nights in White Satin" and Hoagy Carmichael's "Stardust"—was the result of what Otway's website described as a "well orchestrated campaign" by fans.

Allmusic rates the album as a "triumph" and gives it 4 1/2 out of 5 stars.

Track listing
All songs written by John Otway except where noted

Side one
 "Place Farm Way" - 3:31
 "To Anne" - 3:27
 "Beware of the Flowers ('Cos I'm Sure They're Going to Get You Yeah)" - 2:30
 "The Alamo" (Jane Bowers) - 3:16
 "Oh My Body is Making Me" - 4:09

Side two
1. "Josephine" (Otway, Warren Harry) - 7:02
2.  "Schnot" - 2:44
3. (a) "Riders in the Sky" (Stan Jones)
 (b) "Running From the Law"
 (c) "Riders in the Sky" - 3:03
4.  "I Wouldn't Wish It On You" - 3:11
5.  "Can't Complain" - 2:32

Personnel
 John Otway - lead vocals, guitar,
 Wild Willy Barrett - guitar, violin
 Nigel Pegrum - drums
 Maggie Ryder - backing vocals
 Mark Freeman - drums
 Dave Holmes - drums
 Yvonne Grech - backing vocals
 Simon Hanson
Technical
Adam Francis - engineer
Jill Mumford - sleeve design
Paddy Eckersley - photography

References

1978 albums
John Otway albums
Polydor Records albums